The John Y. and Emerette C. Smith House, at 518 North 100 East in Lehi, Utah, was built in 1903.  It was listed on the National Register of Historic Places in 1998.

It was home during 1903 to 1911 of John Y. Smith, "a significant businessman, civic leader, and Utah State Senator".

References

Houses on the National Register of Historic Places in Utah
Victorian architecture in Utah
Neoclassical architecture in Utah
Houses completed in 1903
Houses in Utah County, Utah
Buildings and structures in Lehi, Utah
National Register of Historic Places in Utah County, Utah